The Aerial Navigation Act 1913 was an amendment of the Aerial Navigation Act 1911, designed to protect British airspace. It was passed within a week and gave the British government the authority to shoot down aircraft flying over prohibited territory.

References

External links 
Hansard. 10 February 1913
National Archives

United Kingdom Acts of Parliament 1913
Aviation history of the United Kingdom
History of transport in the United Kingdom